Authors or, The Game of Authors is an educational game for three to five players.  First  was published by G. M. Whipple & A. A. Smith of Salem, Massachusetts in 1861, The Game of Authors was in 1897 published by Parker Brothers, also located in Salem, Massachusetts at that time.

 
The Game of Authors is one of the earliest versions of the family of Go Fish games, in which players call on each other to give up a named card. The play is based on a specialized deck of playing cards.

Later decks included additional authors, but the authors represented in most decks are:
 Louisa May Alcott
 James Fenimore Cooper
 Charles Dickens
 Nathaniel Hawthorne
 Washington Irving
 Henry Wadsworth Longfellow
 Sir Walter Scott
 William Shakespeare
 Robert Louis Stevenson
 Alfred, Lord Tennyson
 Mark Twain

See also
 Quartets (card game)
 Go Fish

References

External links

Card games introduced in the 1860s
Quartet group